Since 1915 there have been fifteen Australians awarded the Nobel Prize. Almost half of these prizes (eight) have been awarded in the field of Physiology or Medicine Most Australians awarded Nobel prizes before the end of the awarding of British/Imperial honours (in 1992) also received (or were offered) knighthoods.

This list includes laureates who were not born in Australia, but who nevertheless spent a significant portion of their training or career there.

In 2017, the International Campaign to Abolish Nuclear Weapons, which was launched in Australia, was awarded the Nobel Peace Prize.

Australian Nobel laureates

Australian laureates by birthplace

References

External links 
 All Nobel Laureates from the Nobel Foundation
 The White Hat Guide to Australian Nobel Prize Winners

 
Nobel laureates
Australian